Ordinary Dreams; Or How to Survive a Meltdown with Flair, is a black comedy written by Marcus Markou, which premiered at the Trafalgar Studios on 14 May 2009 and ran until 6 June. The cast included Sia Berkeley, Adrian Bower, James Lance and Imogen Slaughter. The story concerns a character who during a recession has a breakdown and fantasizes about becoming the Prime Minister of Great Britain. 

The Spectator magazine review called it "A bourgeois sitcom with a macabre heart and a central character who responds to stress by indulging in a satirical dream-life". The review in The Sunday Times was scathing and gave it one star. 

The play was directed by Adam Barnard and produced by James Seabright.

References

 Ordinary Dreams review at the Official London Theatre Guide
 Ordinary Dreams review at the Spectator
 Ordinary Dreams review in The Sunday Times

External links
 Ordinary Dreams website

British plays